The Engen brothers (born in Norway), emigrated to Utah, United States, where they became known for their skills as skiers. They also helped to develop skiing and especially ski jumping, in the Intermountain West.

The brothers
Alf Engen (May 15, 1909 – July 20, 1997)
Sverre Engen (January 28, 1911 – April 4, 2001)
Corey Engen (March 30, 1916 – May 9, 2006)

References
Engen, Alan K. First Tracks: A Century of Skiing in Utah (Gibbs Smith, 2001) 

Sibling trios
People from Utah
American male ski jumpers
Norwegian male ski jumpers
Norwegian emigrants to the United States